Isaac Webb may refer to:

 Ike Webb (1874–1950), English football goalkeeper
 Isaac Webb (shipbuilder) (1794–1840), American shipbuilder
 Isaac Webb (pilot boat), 19th-century pilot boat